Wolf Hall is a British television serial first broadcast on BBC Two in January 2015. The six-part series is an adaptation of two of Hilary Mantel's novels, Wolf Hall and Bring Up the Bodies, a fictionalised biography documenting the rapid rise to power of Thomas Cromwell in the court of Henry VIII through to the death of Sir Thomas More, followed by Cromwell's success in freeing the king of his marriage to Anne Boleyn.  Wolf Hall was first broadcast in April 2015 in the United States on PBS and in Australia on BBC First. It was reported in 2022 that a second series, covering the final novel in the trilogy, was in pre-production, with Mark Rylance and director Peter Kosminsky returning.

The series was a critical success and received eight nominations at the 67th Primetime Emmy Awards and three nominations at the 73rd Golden Globe Awards, winning for Best Miniseries or Television Film.

Plot 
The series centres on the character of Thomas Cromwell, a lawyer who has risen from humble beginnings. The action opens at a point in Cromwell's career where his master, Cardinal Thomas Wolsey, is about to fall from power because of his failure to secure a marriage annulment for King Henry VIII of England. It proceeds through Cromwell's own rise to political power, and ends with the execution of Anne Boleyn.

Cast

Principal
 
 Mark Rylance as Thomas Cromwell
 Damian Lewis as Henry VIII
 Claire Foy as Anne Boleyn
 Bernard Hill as Duke of Norfolk
 Anton Lesser as Thomas More
 Mark Gatiss as Stephen Gardiner
 Mathieu Amalric as Eustache Chapuys
 Joanne Whalley as Katherine of Aragon
 Lily Lesser as Princess Mary
 Jonathan Pryce as Cardinal Wolsey
 Thomas Brodie-Sangster as Rafe Sadler
 Tom Holland as Gregory Cromwell
 Harry Lloyd as Harry Percy
 Jessica Raine as Jane Rochford
 Saskia Reeves as Johane Williamson
 Charity Wakefield as Mary Boleyn

Supporting
 
 Richard Dillane as Duke of Suffolk
 David Robb as Sir Thomas Boleyn
 Edward Holcroft as George Rochford
 Joss Porter as Richard Cromwell
 Jonathan Aris as James Bainham
 Natasha Little as Liz Cromwell
 Will Keen as Thomas Cranmer
 Tim Steed as Lord Chancellor Audley
 Ed Speleers as Edward Seymour
 Kate Phillips as Jane Seymour
 Paul Ritter as Sir John Seymour
 Enzo Cilenti as Antonio Bonvisi
 Luke Roberts as Harry Norris
 Alastair Mackenzie as William Brereton
 Max Fowler as Mark Smeaton
 Robert Wilfort as George Cavendish
 Aimee-Ffion Edwards as Elizabeth Barton
 Felix Scott as Francis Bryan
 Jacob Fortune-Lloyd as Francis Weston
 Bryan Dick as Richard Rich
 Lucy Russell as Lady Shelton
 James Larkin as Master Treasurer FitzWilliam
 Joel MacCormack as Thomas Wriothesley
 Thomas Arnold as Hans Holbein the Younger
 Richard Durden as Bishop Fisher
 Sarah Crowden as Lady Exeter
 Janet Henfrey as Lady Margaret Pole
 Nigel Cooke as Sir Nicholas Carew
 Benjamin Whitrow as Archbishop Warham
 Hannah Steele as Mary Shelton
 Paul Clayton as William Kingston
 Kerry Ingram as Alice Williamson
 Emma Hiddleston as Meg More
 Florence Bell as Helen Barre
 Iain Batchelor as Thomas Seymour

Production
On 23 August 2012, BBC Two announced several new commissions, one of which was Wolf Hall. According to The Guardian £7 million was to be spent on the adaptation. BBC Two controller Janice Hadlow said it was "very fortunate to have the rights" to the two novels and called Wolf Hall "a great contemporary novel".

Peter Kosminsky, the director of the series, said: This is a first for me. But it is an intensely political piece. It is about the politics of despotism, and how you function around an absolute ruler. I have a sense that Hilary Mantel wanted that immediacy. ... When I saw Peter Straughan's script, only a first draft, I couldn't believe what I was reading. It was the best draft I had ever seen. He had managed to distil 1,000 pages of the novels into six hours, using prose so sensitively. He's a theatre writer by trade."

The drama series features 102 characters and Kosminsky began casting the other parts in October 2013. Although originally set to film in Belgium, most of the filming took place on location at some of the finest British medieval and Tudor houses and buildings: Berkeley Castle, Gloucester Cathedral and Horton Court in Gloucestershire, Penshurst Place in Kent, Broughton Castle and Chastleton House in Oxfordshire, Barrington Court, Cothay Manor and Montacute House in Somerset,  St Donat's Castle in the Vale of Glamorgan, and Great Chalfield Manor and Lacock Abbey in Wiltshire. The series was filmed from May to July 2014. The series, which was made in association with Masterpiece Entertainment and Playground Entertainment, consists of six episodes and was broadcast on BBC Two in the UK from 21 January 2015.The Guardian speculated that the BBC's hiring of Kosminsky with Straughan showed they wanted "a darker and grittier take on British history" than more fanciful programmes such as The Tudors or The White Queen. Mantel called Straughan's scripts a "miracle of elegant compression and I believe with such a strong team the original material can only be enhanced".

Kosminsky's decision to film many of the interior scenes by candlelight led to the actors bumping into things, and fearing they might catch fire.Wolf Hall was filmed in two locations in Kent: Dover Castle doubled for the Tower of London, and the Long Gallery, Tapestry Room, and Queen Elizabeth Room at Penshurst Place were used as specific rooms in Whitehall (York Place), which was Anne Boleyn and Henry VIII's residence. The Long Gallery doubled as Anne Boleyn's chamber. Some scenes were filmed at Stanway House in Gloucestershire.   

The series' executive producer, Colin Callender, stated in February 2015 that he hoped that the BBC would commission an extension of the series based on the final novel in Mantel's trilogy, The Mirror and the Light, which was published in 2020. Callender said that lead performers Mark Rylance and Damian Lewis were "eager" to return.

A second series of Wolf Hall was confirmed on 27 May 2019.

Series episodes

Reception
Critics have been "almost unanimous" in their praise of the series, with particular reference to the attention to period detail, the faithful adaptation of the source novels, Kosminsky's direction, and the performances of the leading cast members, particularly Rylance as Cromwell and Foy as Boleyn.  Review aggregator Rotten Tomatoes gave the show a 98% rating based on 41 reviews with an average rating of 8.45/10. The website's critical consensus states, "Beautifully filmed and brilliantly acted, Wolf Hall masterfully brings Hilary Mantel's award-winning novels to life."  Sam Wollaston in The Guardian called it "sumptuous, intelligent, event television." Will Dean in The Independent felt that it did not compare favourably with the stage adaptation of the book, yet he predicted that it would "secure a devoted following." James Walton in The Daily Telegraph gave the first episode five stars out of five, commenting: "it’s hard to see how this one could have been done much better." Mick Adam Noya from the television review show Channel Crossing called Wolf Hall "the best show of 2015".

A few dissenting voices found some flaws. The Daily Telegraph alleged that there was a substantial drop in ratings between the first and second episodes, despite all the following episodes holding high and consistent ratings. Simon Schama stated concerns about how the series depicted historical figures. Emily Nussbaum of The New Yorker cited "small weaknesses", but wrote "the show’s deliberately paced six hours turn out to be riveting, precisely because they are committed, without apology or, often, much explanation, to the esotericism of their subject matter." Sophie Gilbert of The Atlantic wrote, "Magnificent...a tour de force."

The lighting design, which used historically accurate natural light sources (such as candlelight for evening scenes) prompted criticism from viewers who felt parts of the series appeared too dark.

International broadcast
 Australia: BBC First premiered the series on 11 April 2015 and it was watched by 46,000 viewers.
 United States: PBS broadcast the series on Masterpiece'' from 5 April 2015 to 10 May 2015. The series was subsequently licensed to Amazon Prime.
 Germany / France: Arte broadcast the series on 21 and 28 January 2016.

Accolades
For the 5th Critics' Choice Television Awards, the series received four nominations: Best Limited Series, Mark Rylance for Best Actor, Jonathan Pryce for Best Supporting Actor, and Claire Foy for Best Supporting Actress.

References

External links

 
  & Episode list at IMDb.
 Hilary Mantel's website
 Hilary Mantel's Facebook fan page

2010s British drama television series
2010s British television miniseries
2015 British television series debuts
2015 British television series endings
BBC television royalty dramas
Best Miniseries or Television Movie Golden Globe winners
Cultural depictions of Henry VIII
Cultural depictions of Anne Boleyn
Cultural depictions of Catherine of Aragon
English-language television shows
House of Tudor
Monarchy in fiction
Television series by All3Media
Television series about the history of England
Television series set in the 16th century
Television set in Tudor England
Television shows set in England
Cultural depictions of Margaret Pole, Countess of Salisbury